Ed Greene is an American drummer and session musician.

In 1971 he recorded with Donald Byrd (Ethiopian Knights, 1972), together with Thurman Green, Harold Land, Bobby Hutcherson, Joe Sample, Bobbye Porter Hall, David T. Walker, and Wilton Felder, among others.

Greene has also recorded with Barry White, Stanley Turrentine, B.B. King, Ramsey Lewis, Dizzy Gillespie, Steely Dan, Bobby "Blue" Bland, Phoebe Snow, Diana Ross and Marvin Gaye, among others.

Greene was Barry White's drummer on recording sessions, and he played on many of White's biggest hits, including his 1973 hit "I'm Gonna Love You Just a Little More Baby".

Partial discography 
1972: Ethiopian Knights - Donald Byrd
1974: Dreamer - Bobby Blue Bland
1974: Pieces of Dreams - Stanley Turrentine
1975: Love Will Keep Us Together - Captain & Tennille
1976: First Course - Lee Ritenour
1976: American Pastime - Three Dog Night
1976: Wired - Jeff Beck
1977: Free Ride - Dizzy Gillespie
1977: Baby It's Me - Diana Ross
1977: Introducing Sparks - Sparks
1977: Aja - Steely Dan
1978: Dane Donohue - Dane Donohue 
1978: That's What Friends Are For - Johnny Mathis and Deniece Williams
1978: Destiny - The Jacksons
1979: When Love Comes Calling - Deniece Williams
1980: Endangered Species - Klaatu
1980: Man's Best Friend - Livingston Taylor
1980: Dee Dee Bridgewater - Dee Dee Bridgewater
1980: Nothin' Matters and What If It Did - John Mellencamp
1982: The Nightfly - Donald Fagen
1986: Boomtown - David & David
1993: Love Makes No Sense - Alexander O'Neal
1994: Blue Night - Percy Sledge
1999: Living Without Your Love - Dusty Springfield
2004: Shining Through The Rain - Percy Sledge
2006: (Nashville session for Lonnie Lee, with Bob Babbitt and Wayne Jackson)

References

Living people
American session musicians
American drummers
Year of birth missing (living people)